The 7A3 was an American hip hop group based out of Los Angeles, California, United States, which released one album in 1988 called Coolin' in Cali. It was originally composed of brothers Brett and Sean Bouldin, and DJ Muggs, who later achieved greater fame with Cypress Hill was recruited by Brett and joined the group. All originally hailed from New York—Brooklyn and Queens, respectively.

Brett Bouldin founded the group and later wrote Cypress Hill's "Hand on the Pump". He also taught B-Real, Son Doobie, Sean B, Malverde, and others how to write songs. He has written for and performed with others including Shanice Wilson, Portrait, Sugar Ray, and Funkdoobiest.

Sean Bouldin went on to become a music executive working with several labels including Interscope, A&M, EMI, Immortal, DreamWorks, and consulted for several others.

The group's sole album and two of its singles performed moderately well on the US charts. The group's song "Mad, Mad World" was released on the Colors soundtrack. In addition, the group's version of "Take You Back" was featured on the Rocky V soundtrack album.

Discography

Albums
Coolin' in Cali (1988) (Geffen/Warner Bros. Records 24209) #47 R&B/Hip-Hop

Singles
“The 7A3 Will Rock You” (1987)
“Mad, Mad World” (1988)
"Party Time / Why?" (1988)
"Coolin' in Cali" (1988) #64 R&B/Hip-Hop
“Drums of Steel” (1989) #87 R&B/Hip-Hop
"Goes Like Dis" (1989)

References

External links
 
The 7A3 on Rapartists.com

Hip hop groups from New York City
Hip hop groups from California
Musical groups from Los Angeles
Geffen Records artists
1987 establishments in New York (state)